is a subway station on the Toei Mita Line in Minato, Tokyo, Japan, operated by the Tokyo subway operator Tokyo Metropolitan Bureau of Transportation (Toei).

Lines
It is numbered "I-05".

Station layout
The station consists of two side platforms serving two tracks on the second basement ("B2F") level.

Platforms

History
The station opened on 27 November 1973.

Passenger statistics
In fiscal 2011, the station was used by an average of 26,107 passengers daily.

Surrounding area
 Shiba Park
 Jikei University School of Medicine
 Tokyo Tower
 Mielparque Tokyo
 National Route 15

See also
 List of railway stations in Japan

References

External links

 Toei station information

Railway stations in Japan opened in 1973
Railway stations in Tokyo
Toei Mita Line